The Intermountain Power Agency, located in Utah, is a power generating cooperative of 23 municipalities in Utah and 6 in California.  It owns the Intermountain Power Plant near Delta, Utah, one of the largest coal-fired power plants in the United States.  About 75 percent of the generated power is purchased by cities in southern California and the remainder is purchased by cities, cooperatives and Pacificorp in Utah and a cooperative in Nevada.  The IPA also runs transmission lines to Mona, Utah, to Adelanto Converter Station in Adelanto, California and near Ely, Nevada.

In 2010 the IPA and the Utah Associated Municipal Power Systems filed a lawsuit against the Los Angeles Department of Water and Power for trying to prevent a third coal-fired unit at the IPP generation site due to carbon dioxide emissions concerns. The plant is scheduled to be converted to natural gas by 2025 at a cost of $500 million.

Cooperative partners
Cooperative partners of the Intermountain Power Agency include the following:

California purchasers

 Burbank City
 Anaheim City
 Glendale City
 Los Angeles Department of Water and Power
 Pasadena City
 Riverside City

Utah cooperative purchasers

 Bridger Valley Electric Association
 Dixie-Escalante Rural Electric Association, Inc.
 Flowell Electric Association
 Garkane Power Association, Inc.
 Moon Lake Electric Association, Inc.
 Mt. Wheeler Power, Inc.

Utah municipal purchasers

 Beaver City
 Bountiful City
 Enterprise City
 Ephraim City
 Fairview City
 Fillmore City
 Heber Light & Power Company
 Town of Holden
 Hurricane City
 Hyrum City
 Town of Kanosh
 Kaysville City
 Lehi City
 Logan City
 Town of Meadow
 Monroe City
 Morgan City
 Mount Pleasant City
 Murray City
 Parowan City
 Town of Oak City
 Price City
 Spring City

See also

 Path 27

References

External links

 
 Los Angeles Department of Water and Power 

Companies based in Utah
Millard County, Utah
Electric power companies of the United States
1977 establishments in Utah